The Threlkeld Quarry and Mining Museum is located in Threlkeld  east of Keswick, in the heart of the Lake District in Cumbria. It caters for families, school classes, and enthusiasts. It includes a quarry with a collection of historic machinery, such as locomotives and cranes, an underground tour of a realistic mine, a comprehensive geological and mining museum, and mineral panning.

Quarry 

Threlkeld Quarry originally opened in 1870 to supply railway ballast to the Penrith-Keswick line. Later, the stone was used by the Manchester Corporation Water Works for their Thirlmere scheme, for railway ballast for the Crewe-Carlisle line, for roadstone, kerbing, and for facing buildings with dressed stone. The granite quarry finally closed in 1982 and is now the site for the Threlkeld Quarry & Mining Museum which is operated by staff and volunteers.

Railway

Sir Tom 
The steam locomotive 'Sir Tom' was built by W.G. Bagnall of Stafford in 1926 and named after Sir Tom Callender of British Insulated Callender's Cables (BICC). This 0-4-0 saddle tank narrow gauge locomotive worked at BICC in Kent until 1968. After being idle for thirty-three years, it arrived at Threlkeld in 2001, and since then has been completely overhauled. Sir Tom was rebuilt and is driven by Ian Hartland. The locomotive completed the first full season of work at Threlkeld Quarry and Mining Museum in 2010. Sir Tom is mainly used to haul passenger trains from the middle quarry into the inner quarry.

Museum 
The museum has been in operation for more than ten years, and the site continues to expand through the dedication of the staff and volunteers. The museum is open 6 days a week (closed Mondays) from Easter to October.

Open-air exhibition

References

External links 

www.threlkeldquarryandminingmuseum.co.uk
www.tqrm.org.uk

Keswick, Cumbria
Mining museums in England
Museums in Cumbria
2 ft gauge railways in England